Sébastien Nasra is the founder and president of music festivals and conferences M for Montreal and Mundial Montreal.

Career 
Sébastien Nasra is a former musician who studied law. In 1994, when he was 23, he founded Avalanche Productions, a multiservice agency who launched the careers of The Soul Attorneys, Jorane, Taima, Elisapie, Beast and Thus Owls, and Avalanche Sound Publishing.

In 2006, with the help of his friend and mentor Martin Elbourne (Glastonbury, The Great Escape), he founded a new showcase-festival-conference and export platform that he named M for Montreal. The festival was a stepping stone for the career of artists such as Patrick Watson, We are Wolves, Duchess Says, Of Monsters and Men, Besnard Lakes, Plants & Animals, The Barr Brothers, Blue Hawaii, Half Moon Run, Mac DeMarco, and more.

In 2011, he and his friend Derek Andrews, a Canadian programmer, adapted M for Montreal’s formula to create a world music festival, Mundial Montreal. It’s the only event of this genre in North America.

Sébastien has also served on the Board of Directors of organizations like the SOCAN, the APEM/PMPA (Quebec Professional Music Publishers Association) and ADISQ (Quebec's Professional Independent Music Industry & Trade Association). He was also mandated by the government to develop their initiative Planète Québec.

References

Music festival founders
People from Montreal